Rebecca Solnit (born 1961) is an American writer. She has written on a variety of subjects, including feminism, the environment, politics, place, and art.

Early life and education
Solnit was born in 1961 in Bridgeport, Connecticut, to a Jewish father and Irish Catholic mother. In 1966, her family moved to Novato, California, where she grew up. "I was a battered little kid. I grew up in a really violent house where everything feminine and female and my gender was hated," she has said of her childhood. She skipped high school altogether, enrolling in an alternative junior high in the public school system that took her through tenth grade, when she passed the General Educational Development tests. Thereafter she enrolled in junior college. When she was 17, she went to study in Paris. She returned to California to finish her college education at San Francisco State University. She then received a master's degree in journalism from the University of California, Berkeley in 1984 and has been an independent writer since 1988.

Career

Activism
Solnit has worked on environmental and human rights campaigns since the 1980s, notably with the Western Shoshone Defense Project in the early 1990s, as described in her book Savage Dreams, and with antiwar activists throughout the Bush era. She has discussed her interest in climate change and the work of 350.org and the Sierra Club, and in women's rights, especially violence against women.

Writing
Her writing has appeared in numerous publications in print and online, including The Guardian newspaper and Harper's Magazine, where she is the first woman to regularly write the Easy Chair column founded in 1851. She was also a regular contributor to the political blog TomDispatch and is (as of 2018) a regular contributor to LitHub.

Solnit is the author of seventeen books as well as essays in numerous museum catalogs and anthologies. Her 2009 book A Paradise Built in Hell: The Extraordinary Communities that Arise in Disaster began as an essay called "The Uses of Disaster: Notes on Bad Weather and Good Government" published by Harper’s magazine the day that Hurricane Katrina hit the Gulf coast. It was partially inspired by the 1989 Loma Prieta earthquake, which Solnit described as "a remarkable occasion...a moment when everyday life ground to a halt and people looked around and hunkered down". In a conversation with filmmaker Astra Taylor for BOMB magazine, Solnit summarized the radical theme of A Paradise Built in Hell: "What happens in disasters demonstrates everything an anarchist ever wanted to believe about the triumph of civil society and the failure of institutional authority."

In 2014, Haymarket Books published Men Explain Things to Me, a collection of short essays on feminism, including one on the phenomenon of "mansplaining." Men Explain Things to Me has been translated into many languages, including Spanish, French, German, Polish, Portuguese, Finnish, Swedish, Italian, Slovak, Dutch, and Turkish. Solnit has been credited with paving the way for the coining of the word "mansplaining," which has been used to refer to instances in which men "explain" things generally to women in a condescending or patronizing way, but Solnit did not use the term in her original essay. Solnit's book included illustrations from visual and performance artist Ana Teresa Fernández. 
In 2019, Solnit rewrote a new version of Cinderella, also for Haymarket Books, called Cinderella Liberator. In this feminist revision, Solnit reclaims Ella from the cinders and gives both the prince ("Prince Nevermind" in her version) and Ella new futures that involve thinking for themselves, acting out free will, starting businesses, and becoming friends, rather than dependent lovers. As Syreeta McFadden argued for NBC News, Cinderella has long been retold, changing with the times. Solnit's book uses Arthur Rackham’s original silhouetted drawings of Cinderella.

Reception
Solnit has received two NEA fellowships for Literature, a Guggenheim Fellowship, a Creative Capital Award, a Lannan literary fellowship, and a 2004 Wired Rave Award for writing on the effects of technology on the arts and humanities. In 2010, Utne Reader magazine named Solnit as one of the "25 Visionaries Who Are Changing Your World". Her The Faraway Nearby (2013) was nominated for a National Book Award, and shortlisted for the 2013 National Book Critics Circle Award.

New York Times book critic Dwight Garner called Solnit "the kind of rugged, off-road public intellectual America doesn't produce often enough. ... Solnit's writing, at its worst, can be dithering and self-serious, Joan Didion without the concision and laser-guided wit. At her best, however [...] she has a rare gift: the ability to turn the act of cognition, of arriving at a coherent point of view, into compelling moral drama."

For River of Shadows, Solnit was honored with the 2004 National Book Critics Circle Award in Criticism and the 2004 Sally Hacker Prize from the Society for the History of Technology, which honors exceptional scholarship that reaches beyond the academy toward a broad audience. Solnit was also awarded Harvard's Mark Lynton History Prize in 2004 for River of Shadows. Solnit was awarded the 2015–16 Corlis Benefideo Award for Imaginative Cartography by the North American Cartographic Information Society  Solnit's book, Call Them By Their True Names: American Crises, won the 2018 Kirkus Prize for Nonfiction. She won the 2019 Windham–Campbell Literature Prize in Non-Fiction.

Solnit credits Eduardo Galeano, Pablo Neruda, Ariel Dorfman, Elena Poniatowska, Gabriel García Márquez, Virginia Woolf, and Henry David Thoreau as writers who have influenced her work.

Bibliography

Books

Essays and reporting

See also
Fourth-wave feminism
Women's rights in 2014

References

External links

 
 
 

1961 births
Living people
20th-century American non-fiction writers
20th-century American women writers
21st-century American non-fiction writers
21st-century American women writers
Activists from the San Francisco Bay Area
American people of Irish descent
American people of Jewish descent
American women non-fiction writers
Fourth-wave feminism
Harper's Magazine people
The New Yorker people
PEN Oakland/Josephine Miles Literary Award winners
People from Novato, California
San Francisco State University alumni
University of California, Berkeley alumni
Kirkus Prize winners